Agnez Mo, stylized as AGNEZ MO, is  the fourth studio album by Indonesian singer Agnez Mo. The album introduced her new stage name, which previously known as 'Agnes Monica'. It was originally recorded as her demo CD which was sent out to record labels in the US in order to secure a record deal for her US debut. Although the tracks are in English, she secured a deal with Indomaret and Kopi Kapal Api to release the demo tracks to the Indonesian market only. The album was released digitally on 1 June 2013  by Entertainment Inc., via Souniq Music, a new music application in Southeast Asia region.

Singles
The first single, "Walk", was released on 1 June 2013 with simPATI, and peaked at number one on the Rolling Stone Indonesia. "Walk" was also used as soundtrack for "Simpati" Telkomsel. The video clip project of "Walk with simPATI" has been involved extensively in the manufacture of various communities this video. About video clip project uploaded on 20 June 2013 via YouTube has been viewed more than 2.2 million.
http://foldermusic.info/site-download.html?to-id=6232 => Agnez Mo – Karena Ku
Sanggup [OST Aluna RCTI]

Music video
Music video of "Walk" was released. This music video was made with various videos uploaded from many of her fans as the background who have co-participated in the project of making the music video "Walk" by uploading videos on the website Telkomsel. The official music video of "Walk" can be watched on YouTube

Track listing

References

Agnez Mo albums
2013 albums
Electronica albums